1815 in Sri Lanka marks the turn from the Kandyan period to the British Ceylon period, when the Kingdom of Kandy was disestablished and the creation of British Ceylon as the sole polity on the island.

Incumbents

Kingdom of Kandy (Until 5 March)

British Ceylon (From 5 March)

Events

January

February
 10 February – British forces enter Kandy during the Second Kandyan War.

March
 2 March – The Kandyan Convention, an agreement between the Kandyan chiefs and the British is signed deposing King Sri Vikrama Rajasinha and ceding of the kingdom's territory to British rule.

April

May

June

July

August

September

October

November

December

Unknown
 – St. Thomas' Church, Colombo the first Anglican church built in Sri Lanka starts construction in Kotahena, Colombo
 – Newstead Girls College the oldest existing girls' college and the third oldest public school in Sri Lanka, founded by Wesleyan ministers in Negombo.

Births

March
 9 March - Richard Kelly, 82 (d. 1897),  (British Army officer)

Deaths

April
 29 April - James Stuart, 73 (b. 1741),  (British Army officer)

December
 15 December - Gajaman Nona, 69 (b. 1746), (author)

See also
Years in Sri Lanka

References

 
1810s in Sri Lanka
Sri Lanka
Sri Lanka
Years of the 19th century in Sri Lanka
1815 in Ceylon
1810s in Ceylon